Stewarts Point is an unincorporated community in Sonoma County, California, United States and part of the "historic" Salt Point Township. Stewarts Point was originally part of the German Rancho, and was purchased by William Bihler in 1852. The unincorporated area is named for the first residents, the Stewart family, who moved to the area in 1856. In the official history for the United States Post Office, the name was said to have been given by Lt. Col. S. Stewart in 1888, however newspaper archives refer to the area as Stewarts Point as early as 1867.

Stewarts Point and the adjacent Fisherman Bay have a long and important history to the indigenous Pomo people, Kashia Band of Pomo Indians of the Stewarts Point Rancheria who have lived in the area for millennia. The large sheltered cove fed by a small creek offered access to the area's bountiful marine and coastal resources. The topographic advantages of this location were equally recognized by Euro-American settlers who set out from San Francisco to take advantage of the coastal redwood forest. John and Andrew Fisk built the first landing at Stewarts Point in 1867. By 1877, three lumber chutes shipped out products from nearby mills.

The community was, and still is, an important part of California's timber industry, shipping ports, railroads, lumber mills, and tie camps operated out of the settlement.

Murder of Lina Davenport (L.D.) Helm 
In late 1860, two brothers L. Davenport and Turner Harmon Helm, laid claim on land in Stewarts Point by squatting on a claim that belonged to Michael T. McClellan. The Helm brothers were part of the outlaw Helm Clan and cousins to the infamous Boone Helm aka The Kentucky Cannibal. Boone was an outlaw that caused mayhem throughout the west and after a warrant for his arrest was issued he was sheltered in the mountains behind Stewart's Point by his cousins. L. Davenport and Turner along with their brothers James, Daunt (John), Weid (William Johnson), and Chat (Chatham E.) had arrived in California during the Gold Rush. The other brothers headed to Southern California, and Turner and L. Davenport arrived in Stewarts Point. After an argument with Sarah Stewart, Samuel's wife, Thomas Stewart, her son, killed Davenport. After a five-year trial, Thomas was sentenced to life in prison. The Stewart family eventually migrated North and settled first in Point Arena, and then Fort Bragg.  Turner Helm migrated to Southern California to join up with his brothers in the Borrego Springs area. Boone Helm migrated up through Oregon and into Montana where he was hung. L. Davenport Helm was the first person to be buried in the Stewart's Point Cemetery, at the base of the lone tree in the cemetery.

Stewarts Point Hotel
The Stewarts Point Hotel, adjacent to the present day Stewarts Point Store, was the second hotel built in the Salt Point Township.  John and Andrew Fisk, built the hotel between 1870 and 1872. This is the only hotel that was built on the Sonoma Coast in the 1800s that is still standing today. The hotel closed in 1925, and has remained a private residence for the Richardson family.

Stewarts Point School
The Stewarts Point School District, along with the Salt Point School District, were the original school districts in the township.  The schoolhouse south of the Stewarts Point store was built in the 1880s. There was another building behind the store that served as a schoolhouse prior to the one built in the 1880s.

Richardson Family 
The property was purchased in 1881 by timber baron and shipping Herbert Archer (H.A.) Richardson from the Fisk family. H.A. Richardson arrived in Stewarts Point with his wife Althea Ball, the first week of April, 1876.  Both Fisk and Richardson were natives of Lisbon, New Hampshire. H.A. Richardson amassed over 50,000 acres along the Sonoma Coast that included eight miles of shoreline and the town of Stewarts Point.  His descendants grew up working in the Stewarts Point Store.

In 2010, Save the Redwoods League purchased a portion of the ranch formerly owned by Archer Ralph Richardson, from John K. "Jack" Richardson, and Archer James Richardson for 11.25 million dollars.

In 2015, descendants of H.A. Richardson, the children of Julia Archea Richardson, sold the Anderson Ranch (700 acres), which bordered H.A. Richardson's property, but was owned and purchased from the Anderson's by Archer Herbert and Anna Marx Richardson, for $6 million to the Trust for Public Land, which transferred the property to the Kashia people.

In 2017, descendants of H.A. Richardson sold the McCappen Ranch, part of H.A. Richardson's 50,000 acre spread, to Save the Redwoods in exchange for the aforementioned parcel that was sold in 2010. The McCappen Ranch is the home to the McCappen Tree, a 1,640 year old Redwood that has a trunk diameter as wide as a two-lane street. It is older than the oldest tree in Muir Woods. The property will be opened as the Harold Richardson Redwood Reserve.  Harold was the grandson of H.A. Richardson, and the son of Fontaine Richardson and Lois Comstock.

Notable people
Grace Richardson Butterfield, California Worthy Grand Matron - Order of Eastern Star & Member, California State Parks Commission
Herbert Archer Richardson, California pioneer, Timber Baron, Shipping Magnate

References

External links

Unincorporated communities in California
Unincorporated communities in Sonoma County, California
Populated coastal places in California